The following is a list of notable events and releases that happened in 2021 in music in South Korea.

Notable events and achievements
January 9–10 – IU and BTS win the grand prizes at the 35th Golden Disc Awards.
February 28 – Leenalchi, Jeongmilla, and BTS win the grand prizes at the 18th Korean Music Awards.
March 4 – IFPI names BTS its Global Recording Artist of the Year for 2020—they are the first Asian and first non-English speaking act to top the ranking.
March 5 – "Dynamite" by BTS wins its 32nd music show win, the most out of any K-pop song in history, surpassing "Invisible Love" by Shin Seung-hun with 31 wins set in 1992.
March 13 – "On the Ground" by Rosé becomes the most viewed YouTube music video in 24 hours by a solo K-pop artist, surpassing the record set by Psy with "Gentleman" in 2013.
March 14 – "Rollin'" by Brave Girls wins the group's first music show award, following a surge in popularity due to a compilation featuring the group performing the song going viral. 
March 22 – "Rollin'" breaks the record for most perfect all-kills by a female group since its inception in 2010, with 198 hourly PAKs.
June 1 – "Butter" by BTS becomes their fourth number-one single on the Billboard Hot 100, making them the fastest group to score four number ones since the Jackson 5 in 1970. 
June 17 – Twice's Taste of Love attains a peak of number 6 on the Billboard 200, making them the first female Korean act to chart an EP within the top-ten, and the second female Korean act overall to enter the top-ten on the chart.
August 27 – Melon and Seoul Shinmun publishes their list of 100 Top K-pop Songs of All-Time, selected by a panel of 35 music critics and industry professionals. 
September 1 –  Stray Kids's Noeasy becomes their first album to sell over 1 million copies, making them the first act under JYP Entertainment to achieve the milestone. 
September 10 – Blackpink becomes the most-subscribed music act on YouTube, surpassing Canadian singer Justin Bieber with 65.1 million subscribers.
September 13 – Lisa's "Lalisa" becomes the most-viewed video by a solo singer on YouTube within 24 hours, garnering 73.6 million views. 
CL and Rosé become the first South Korean female musicians to attend the Met Gala in New York City. 
 September 15 – "Dynamite" is included in Rolling Stone's list of 500 Greatest Songs of All Time.
October 28 – Lee Jang-hee is awarded the Eungwan Cultural Medal at the Korean Popular Culture and Arts Awards.
November 3 – NCT 127's Sticker and its repackage Favorite records a total of 3.58 million units in sales, the highest figure for an combined album by an SM Entertainment artist.
November 21 – BTS wins three awards at the American Music Awards, including Artist of the Year, the first Asian act to do so.
December 4 – IU, Aespa, and BTS win the grand prizes at the 2021 Melon Music Awards.
December 11 – Lee Hyori hosts the 2021 Mnet Asian Music Awards, the ceremony's first female host.
BTS wins all four grand prizes at the 2021 MAMA.

Award shows and festivals

Award ceremonies

Festivals

Debuting and disbanding in 2021

Debuting groups

 Billlie
 Blitzers
 bugAboo
 Ciipher
 Epex
 Hot Issue
 Ichillin'
 Ive
 Just B
 Kingdom
 Lightsum
 Luminous
 Mirae
NTX
Omega X 
 Pixy
 Purple Kiss
 T1419
 Tri.be
 WJSN The Black
 Xdinary Heroes

Solo debuts

 Adora
 B.I
 BamBam
 D.O.
 Do Han-se
 I.M
 Jay B
 Jinyoung
 Joy
 Jo Yu-ri
 Kwon Eun-bi
 L
 Lee Seung-hyub
 Lisa
 Park So-yeon
 Rosé
 Sorn
 Wendy
 Young K
 Youngjae
 Yugyeom
 Yuqi

Disbandments

 100%
 1Team
 AOA Black
 B.O.Y
 Berry Good
 ENOi
 GFriend
 Hotshot
 Iz*One
 NTB
 Seven O'Clock
 Sonamoo
 Voisper
 We in the Zone

Releases in 2021

First quarter

January

February

March

Second quarter

April

May

June

Third quarter

July

August

September

Fourth quarter

October

November

December

Deaths
 Iron, age 29. Rapper.

See also
 List of South Korean films of 2021
 List of Gaon Album Chart number ones of 2021
 List of Gaon Digital Chart number ones of 2021

Notes

References

2021 in South Korean music
South Korean music
K-pop